La Toya Jackson-Gordon v. Jack Leon Gordon was a highly publicized trial for a petition for a dissolution of marriage between American singer La Toya Jackson and her husband and manager Jack Gordon. On March 3, 1998, an order was entered by District Judge Carl J. Christensen at Clark County, Nevada, dissolving the marriage and awarding Jackson royalties, property, and a large sum of money.

Marriage history 
Jackson and Gordon were married on September 5, 1989, in Reno, Nevada. According to Jackson's autobiography, the marriage was both unplanned and against her will. She later stated in an interview that Gordon tricked her into the marriage by brainwashing her into believing that her family was going to attempt to kidnap and kill her. What started as a business relationship soon turned into an abusive partnership; Gordon was arrested twice for second-degree assault against Jackson. Jackson also filed a gender-based lawsuit against Gordon before filing for divorce.

Gordon repeatedly used Jackson for a quick profit. In 1996, Gordon attempted to force Jackson to dance at a Reading, Pennsylvania, strip club, Al's Diamond cabaret. She refused to do so and in return, was booed and heckled by the crowd, who paid to see her strip. (Reading Eagle (Reading, PA) Publish date:January 6, 2007). She refused and returned home to be beaten. It was at this point that Jackson left Gordon and immediately filed for divorce and a domestic violence injunction.

Gordon's violations of court orders 
As a part of the original petition, it was requested that Gordon submit financial documents and all records of any property he owned. He exercised his right to not incriminate himself and refused to submit the documents to the court. His attorney admitted to this, and also admitted that Gordon had sold properties that he and Jackson mutually owned without Jackson's permission, despite the fact that the court had previously ordered that he not sell any of these properties until further instruction.

Return of Jackson's property 
From the final divorce decree, Gordon was ordered to return all of Jackson's fur coats, photographs, videos, and furnishings. He was also ordered to forgo his rights to any of Jackson's contracts that she signed during the marriage, including those with Sony Music Entertainment, BMG Music, Playboy Entertainment, and Penguin/Dutton Books. Jackson was awarded full ownership of the Las Vegas apartment where the couple resided during their marriage.

Jackson's legal change of name 
As part of the final judgment, Jackson's maiden name was restored; the document specifically states that her name was changed from La Toya Jackson-Gordon to La Toya Jackson, thus eliminating her former middle name of Yvonne as a part of her legal name.

Restraining order and final settlement 
The judge also ordered that Gordon was strictly forbidden from utilizing the likeness of Jackson in any newspaper, magazine, tabloid, or promotional media, and that any violation of this order would result in severe sanctions. The order concludes with a response to Jackson's petition for a restraining order against Gordon; it was ordered by the court that Gordon and Jackson were both strictly prohibited from going within 100 feet of each other, each other's work place or residence, or any member of each other's family.

Gordon was ordered to provide Jackson with a $350,000 settlement and pay $15,000 to cover Jackson's attorney fees. Jackson later stated in her autobiography "Starting Over" that Gordon did not pay her the $350,000 settlement she was awarded.

Notes

References 
 

La Toya Jackson
Nevada state case law
1998 in United States case law
1998 in Nevada
United States family case law
Divorce law in the United States
20th-century American trials